The Republic of Chad is made up of twenty-three regions.

Chad was divided into regions in 2002. It was previously divided into prefectures, and then departments.

Current regions 
This is a list of the regions of Chad since 2012, with official population figures from the 2009 census, and estimated population figures for 2020.

History
From independence in 1960 until 1999 it was divided into 14 préfectures. These were replaced in 1999 by 28 départements. The country was reorganized again in 2002 to produce 18 régions.  In 2008, a further four régions were created, increasing the number to 22. Ennedi Region was split into Ennedi-Est and Ennedi-Ouest in 2012, producing the current 23 regions.

Regions (2008–2012)

Regions (2002–2008) 

(1) created in 2004

Regions created in 2008 
On February 19, 2008, four new regions were created:

 Former Borkou-Ennedi-Tibesti Region divided into:
 Borkou Region, from Borkou-Ennedi-Tibesti's former Borkou Department
 Ennedi Region, from Borkou-Ennedi-Tibesti's former Ennedi Est and Ennedi Ouest departments
 Tibesti Region, from Borkou-Ennedi-Tibesti's former Tibesti Department
 Split from the Kanem Region:
 Barh El Gazel (Bahr El Gazel) region, from Kanem's former Barh El Gazel (Bahr El Gazel) department
 Split from Ouaddaï Region
 Sila (Dar Sila) region, from Ouaddaï's former Sila and Djourf Al Ahmar (Djourouf Al Ahmar) departments

See also
 ISO 3166-2:TD

References

Other sources

 Décret n° 419/PR/MAT/02 (17 October 2002), concerning the creation of the régions
 Ordonnance n° 002/PR/08 portant restructuration de certaines collectivités territoriales décentralisées (19 February 2008), concerning the creation of new régions in 2008
 
 

 
Subdivisions of Chad
Chad, Regions
Chad 1
Regions, Chad
Chad geography-related lists